A binder clip, less commonly known as a paper clamp or foldover clip or bobby clip or clasp, is a simple device for binding sheets of paper together.  It leaves the paper intact and can be removed quickly and easily, unlike the staple.

In the United Kingdom it is known generically as a bulldog clip, although this term properly refers to an older device with the same function, which is stronger and has rigid rather than folding handles. To distinguish it from rigid clips, the term foldback clip may also be used. It is also sometimes referred to as a handbag clip because of resemblance to a handbag when its clips are folded up.

Characteristics and methods of use

A binder clip is a strip of spring steel bent into the shape of an isosceles triangle with loops at the apex. Tension along the base of the triangle forces the two sides closed, and the loops prevent the sharp steel edges from cutting into the paper. The loops also serve to hold two pieces of stiff wire, which are used as handles and allow the clip to be opened.  The two slots cut in each loop are shaped so that the wire handles can be folded down once the clip has been attached, and the spring force of the wire holds them down on the surface of the paper.  This holds the clip relatively flat, for easier stacking of paper. One handle can also be folded down while the other remains up to allow the stack of papers to be hung up. The handles can also be removed altogether by squeezing them sideways and pulling them out, allowing for more permanent binding. As compared to a paper clip, the binder clip is able to bind sheets of paper more securely, and is also resistant to rust.

There are several sizes of binder clips, ranging from a base size of 5 millimetres (0.2 in) to 50 mm (1.97 in). The sheet steel portion is customarily black oxide coated, but a variety of decorative painted color schemes are also available. The sheet steel portion is occasionally made of stainless steel, the more typical spring steel can also be finished in nickel, silver or gold. The handles are normally nickel-plated.

Uses
The binder clip is in common use in the modern office. It can hold a few to many sheets of paper, and is usually used in place of the paper clip for large volumes of paper. Various practical (and sometimes whimsical) alternative uses have been proposed. These include holding pieces of quilt together, creating a "beer pyramid" in a refrigerator with wire shelves, serving as a bookmark, a cheap alternative to a money clip or preventing computer cables from slipping behind desks. Smaller sized clips have been commonly used as "quick fix" fitting and sizing solutions in the fashion industry.

In 1966, test pilot Joseph F. Cotton used the shiny metal portion of such a clip to short-circuit an electrical circuit panel to force the landing gear of the XB-70 bomber on a flight.

The object is such a common sight in offices that, in late 2020, when restrictions due to the COVID-19 pandemic were lowered and people started returning to their offices, some missed and enjoyed the feeling of using a binder clip, after months without doing so. At around the same time, healthcare workers in at least one medical center used extra large binder clips as a cheap way to secure a plastic curtain between workers and patients infected with the airborne virus.

History
In 1909, the method of binding sheets of paper together was to punch holes in them and tie them together with string or sew them, making it tedious to remove a single sheet of paper.

The binder clip was invented, and patented in 1910 by Washington, D.C. area resident, Louis E. Baltzley, grandson of Elias Howe, to help his father, born in 1848, twin to Edward Baltzley and son of Susan (née Howe) and David C. Baltzley, Edwin Baltzley, developers of Glen Echo Park and Glen Echo, Maryland, a writer, and inventor, with thirteen patents, hold his manuscripts together more easily.

Louis E. Baltzley, with more than thirty other patents, initially produced this invention through the L.E.B. Manufacturing Company. These earliest binder clips are stamped "L.E.B." on one side of the sheet steel. Manufacturing rights were later licensed to other companies.

Louis E. Baltzley
Louis E. Baltzley, born circa 1885, by February 1930, had moved to Glen Ridge, New Jersey married, and had two daughters, one marrying in 1940.

Gallery

See also
 Treasury tag

References

Fasteners
Office equipment
Stationery
Products introduced in 1910

ja:バインダークリップ